Lore Noto (June 9, 1923 – July 8, 2002), born Lorenzo Noto, was a Broadway theatrical producer of The Yearling, a commercial artist, actor and play writer, but best known as the producer of the world's longest-running musical in history — The Fantasticks.

Early life and military career
Noto, born in 1923, began life as a child in a Brooklyn apartment with his Italian immigrant parents and two brothers, but was primarily raised in The Willamsburg Home for Children orphanage from three years of age, upon losing his mother in childbirth with her fourth child.

Noto joined the United States Merchant Marine during World War II. Wounded while in Antwerp, Belgium with a broken back having been trapped under debris for hours in a bombed building, the result of a direct hit by a German V-2 rocket, Noto was selected among a group of ten men to be the first Merchant Seaman to be awarded the Purple Heart medal. He ended his military career as a Chief petty officer in the U.S. Maritime Service in 1946.

Acting and producing career
He began acting in New York City in 1939 with the likes of Dustin Hoffman and Anne Bancroft. Noto also attended shows in hopes of making a better living for his expanding family, as a producer. He attended a rehearsal of an inchoate one-act show, The Fantasticks, and thus fell in love with the Barnard College musical production. He then commissioned the authors to create a two-act Greenwich Village musical version in 1960. This "boy meets girl story", based on Les Romanesques by Edmund Rostand, with its memorable score, is universally adored by all ages.

The curtain was ceremoniously taken down at the final bittersweet production on January 13, 2002, having played 17,162 performances. It retains the notoriety as the "World's Longest Running Musical" in the Guinness World Records. Noto was mentioned twice in the Guinness World Records — achieving a world record of 6,348 performances, as the longest running actor in a single role in any production — having played Hucklebee for about 17 years in his own production (citation was in the 80s, before another actor beat the record later on). The show won an off-Broadway Obie Award, and a special Tony Award in 1992.

During the time that Noto was writing the stage production of the classic Marjorie Kinnan Rawlings' book, "The Yearling", he rented part of his expansive Broadway office to Mel Brooks, who was working on the movie version of "The Producers". The two enjoyed many a laugh in the wee hours while working on their creative projects. Lee Meredith was discovered during that creative time because Noto saw her in a showcase production of Carousel and knew Brooks would be impressed with the tall and beautiful actress.

Personal life
Noto died in 2002. He was married to his beloved Mary (née Luzzi, a published illustrator and homemaker who died at 93 in 2020), to whom he was married in 1947. Lore is survived by his four children, as well as many grandchildren and great grand-children.

References 

1923 births
2002 deaths
American people of Italian descent
Male actors from New York City
American theatre managers and producers
American male stage actors
American male musical theatre actors
20th-century American male singers
20th-century American singers